The Lars Petterson-Fred Gurney Three-Decker is a historic triple decker house in Worcester, Massachusetts.  Built about 1910, it is a good local example of Colonial Revival architecture, built by prominent local builder Lars Petterson.  The house was listed on the National Register of Historic Places in 1990.

Description and history
The Lars Petterson-Fred Gurney Three-Decker is located northeast of downtown Worcester, in the Brittan Square neighborhood.  It is set on the north side of Harlow Street, between Lincoln and Paine Streets.  It is a three-story wood-frame structure, its third floor under a cross-gabled gambrel roof, and its exterior finished mainly in wooden clapboards.  The front facade is asymmetrical, with porches on the left, and a polygonal window bay on the right.  The porches of the first two floors are supported by square posts with arched peaks between them; the second-story porch has been enclosed in glass.  The third-floor porch is set in a round-arch recess under the gambrel roof.

The house was built c. 1910 by Lars Petterson, a local builder who developed a number of other properties in Worcester.  He retained ownership of this house into the 1920s, when he sold it to Fred Gurney, a superintendent at a wire factory.  Early tenants appear to have been employed either at the Norton Company factory in northern Worcester, or in one of the nearby steel and wire factories.

See also
Lars Petterson-James Reidy Three-Decker, 4 Harlow Street
Lars Petterson-Adolph Carlson Three-Decker, 76 Fairhaven Road
Lars Petterson-Silas Archer Three-Decker, 80 Fairhaven Road
National Register of Historic Places listings in eastern Worcester, Massachusetts

References

Apartment buildings on the National Register of Historic Places in Massachusetts
Colonial Revival architecture in Massachusetts
Houses completed in 1910
Apartment buildings in Worcester, Massachusetts
National Register of Historic Places in Worcester, Massachusetts